"Turn All the Lights On" is a song by American rapper and singer T-Pain featuring fellow American singer Ne-Yo, serving as the third official single from the former's fourth studio album, Revolver (2011). Both artists wrote the song with its producers, Dr. Luke and Cirkut.

Track listings
 Digital download
 "Turn All the Lights On" (featuring Ne-Yo) – 3:37

Credits and personnel
 Lead vocals – T-Pain and Ne-Yo
 Producers – Dr. Luke, Cirkut
 Lyrics – Faheem Najm, Luke Gottwald, Shaffer Smith, Henry Walter
 Label: Nappy Boy, Konvict, RCA

Charts

Weekly charts

Year-end charts

Certifications

References 

2012 singles
Ne-Yo songs
T-Pain songs
Songs written by Dr. Luke
Song recordings produced by Dr. Luke
Songs written by Ne-Yo
Song recordings produced by Cirkut (record producer)
Songs written by Cirkut (record producer)
Songs written by T-Pain
2011 songs
RCA Records singles